"Everyway That I Can" is the winning song of the Eurovision Song Contest 2003 sung in English by Sertab Erener for . The song was written by Demir Demirkan in early 2003 and produced and arranged by Ozan Çolakoğlu, famous for his works with pop idol Tarkan. Initially, it sparked controversy in Turkey for its subject matter and English-language lyrics, and was not considered a favorite to win the contest.

The song ultimately won Eurovision Song Contest 2003 by a two-point margin, and went on to achieve commercial success throughout Europe, peaking at number 1 on singles charts in Greece, Sweden, and Turkey, as well as attaining top 10 peaks in Austria, Belgium, the Netherlands, Romania, and Spain. It continues to be ranked among the best Eurovision entries of all time.

Eurovision Song Contest 2003

Background
Having previously selected Erener to represent the nation, Turkish broadcaster TRT chose her song to represent Turkey in the Eurovision Song Contest 2003 in Riga, Latvia. Initially "Everyway That I Can" caused controversy with the Turkish public, considered too racy by some and too pop-oriented by others. Criticism also arose by Sertab's decision to perform it in English instead of Turkish. 

With its selection of singer and song, Turkey was regarded as having "set out to win" the 2003 contest, but Sertab was not widely regarded as a front-runner in the lead-up to the event; Russia's t.A.T.u. was regarded as a favorite to win.

Performance
Turkey performed fourth on the night in May, earning critical acclaim and becoming the first and only country whose song received a standing ovation that year. The song had been re-written slightly to include some high notes and a belly dancing routine was added. Erener sang counter to the rhythm in places and the backing vocals were synthesised with Turkish stringed instruments.

Voting
The voting on the night saw Russia, Turkey, and Belgium switch places at the top a number of times before Slovenia eventually gave Turkey the victory by two points; the song received the maximum 12 points from four countries, the second-highest number (following Russia).

Commercial performance
Following its victory, "Everyway That I Can" was released throughout Europe and sold well. It reached the top of the charts in Turkey, Greece, and Eastern Europe, holding the number-one position in Sweden for three weeks, breaking the top ten in Belgium, the Netherlands, Spain, and Austria and charting within the top twenty in Germany and Switzerland. It received a platinum certification in Greece and a gold certification in Sweden.

The video of the release sees Erener in an Ottoman style castle, its rose gardens, imperial harem (living quarters) and Turkish Bath (hamam). Roses carry a major symbolism throughout the video. Erener is dressed in traditional Turkish styles, and Turkish female dancers are also present.

Remixes of the song were also released, including a Turkish version, a club remix, and a European dance remix. A live version was brought out and also included on the original single CD, along with two Galleon club remixes. The track was included on the official Eurovision 2003 CD as the original version, however.

After Eurovision
Erener was hailed as a national hero by the public and the press and was congratulated by the President Ahmet Necdet Sezer and Prime Minister Recep Tayyip Erdoğan. She was awarded the State Medal of Distinguished Service, among others. Additionally, this success was celebrated as a step forward in the Turkey–European Union relations.

Erener performed the single as a medley at the 2004 final in Istanbul with male dancers and the same choreography. The single was also included in her first English album No Boundaries.

The song continues to perform well in rankings of the all-time best Eurovision entries. In 2005, the song competed in Congratulations: 50 Years of the Eurovision Song Contest as one of the fourteen best ever Eurovision entrants, and finished ninth, beating popular artists such as Celine Dion's "Ne partez pas sans moi", Johnny Logan and Dana International in the process. Erener herself appeared onstage to perform the final verse of the song on the night.

In 2006, it was entered in Die Grand Prix Hitliste, a German version of the above, and beat off stiff competition from ABBA's "Waterloo" and eleven others to finish second. Ruslana's "Wild Dances", the Ukrainian 2004 winning entry, was first.

The song was also included in a compilation of Sertab Erener's national and international hits released in 2007.

Charts

Weekly charts

Year-end charts

Certifications

Cover versions
Dani would later go on to represent  at the Eurovision Song Contest 2015.

References

Eurovision songs of 2003
Turkish popular music
Eurovision songs of Turkey
Congratulations Eurovision songs
Eurovision Song Contest winning songs
Number-one singles in Sweden
English-language Turkish songs
Number-one singles in Greece
Columbia Records singles
Sony Music singles
2003 songs